Main Street Historic District is a historic district in downtown Baton Rouge, Louisiana, located along Main Street, from North 4th Street to North 7th Street.

The  area comprises a total of 11 historic commercial buildings, dating from c.1890 to c.1935.

The historic district was listed on the National Register of Historic Places on November 7, 1985.

Contributing Properties
The historical district contains a total of 11 contributing properties, built between c.1890 and c.1935:
Saltz Building, 442 Main Street, built 1924.
Building at 450-454 Main Street, built c.1920.
Building at 460 Main Street, built c.1935.
Building at 500 Main Street, built c.1890.
Commercial Building #1, built c.1912. No more existing.
Building at 544-546 Main Street, built c.1915.
Duggan Building, 618 Main Street, built c.1920.
Liberto Building, 624-626 Main Street, built 1915.
Building at 640 Main Street, built c.1925.
Building at 654 Main Street, built c.1920.
Building at 660 Main Street, built c.1920.

See also
National Register of Historic Places listings in East Baton Rouge Parish, Louisiana

References

Historic districts on the National Register of Historic Places in Louisiana
Neighborhoods in Baton Rouge, Louisiana
National Register of Historic Places in East Baton Rouge Parish, Louisiana